Grzegorz Filipowski (born 28 July 1966) is a former Polish competitive figure skater. He is the 1985 European bronze medalist, the 1989 European silver medalist and the 1989 World bronze medalist.

Filipowski competed in three Winter Olympics between 1984 and 1992, with a best finish of fifth position in 1988. He missed the first half of the 1987–88 season due to a stress fracture in his left leg.

Filipowski was the first skater to perform a triple-triple combination of jumps (3 toe/3 toe) in competition. Barbara Kossowska coached him in Łódź and Rochester, Minnesota. Filipowski turned pro in 1992 and settled in Canada. He works as a coach in figure skating at the York Region Skating Academy.

Results

References

1966 births
Living people
Polish male single skaters
Figure skaters at the 1992 Winter Olympics
Figure skaters at the 1988 Winter Olympics
Figure skaters at the 1984 Winter Olympics
Olympic figure skaters of Poland
Sportspeople from Łódź
World Figure Skating Championships medalists
European Figure Skating Championships medalists
Competitors at the 1990 Goodwill Games